The 2021–22 William & Mary Tribe men's basketball team represented the College of William & Mary in the 2021–22 NCAA Division I men's basketball season. The Tribe, led by third-year head coach Dane Fischer, played their home games at Kaplan Arena in Williamsburg, Virginia as members of the Colonial Athletic Association.

Previous season
In a season limited due to the ongoing COVID-19 pandemic, the Tribe finished the 2020–21 season 7–10, 4–6 in CAA play to finish in seventh place. They lost to Northeastern in the quarterfinals of the CAA tournament.

Offseason

Departures

Incoming transfers

2021 recruiting class

Roster

Schedule and results 

|-
!colspan=12 style=| Non-conference regular season

|-
!colspan=9 style=| CAA regular season

|-
!colspan=9 style=| 

|-

Source

References

William & Mary Tribe men's basketball seasons
William and Mary Tribe
William and Mary Tribe men's basketball
William and Mary Tribe men's basketball